Tyler Football Club is a Semi-Pro American Soccer club based in Tyler, Texas that plays in the National Premier Soccer League (NPSL) and United Premier Soccer League (UPSL), both who are fourth tier of the American soccer pyramid.

History

About Tyler Football Club
The club was announced as an expansion team by the National Premier Soccer League on December 8, 2016. The club is led by President Christopher Avila a native to Tyler, TX and Vice President Jason Martinez. 2017-2018 was a rough beginning for the club as Tyler FC tried to find their identity in style of play. 2019 was a breakthrough season as higher level recruits came through and players who played in previous seasons began to gain experience playing in the NPSL. In the fall of 2019 Tyler FC joined 4th division UPSL, joining up in the Red River Conference (2nd tier UPSL). After a successful inaugural season in the UPSL 2nd tier, Tyler FC managed to score 49 goals and place 2nd in the nation for most goals scored. Although they did not win their conference they managed to go get promoted to 1st tier UPSL after a breakthrough season.

Year-by-year

Head coaches
  Christopher Avila & Jason Martinez (2017)
  Demetrio Hernadez & Jason Martinez (2018)
  Devy Desiree & Karl Messniere (2019 Spring)
  Christopher Avila, Jason Martinez, Sergio Gardea &  Zoran Smileski (2019 Fall-Current)

Stadium
 Herrington Stadium; Tyler, Texas (2017)
 Kings Park; Chandler, Texas (2018-Current)

References 

Association football clubs established in 2016
Sports in Tyler, Texas
Soccer clubs in Texas
National Premier Soccer League teams
2016 establishments in Texas